Argyrotaenia lautana is a species of moth of the family Tortricidae. It is found in the United States, where it has been recorded from Arizona and California. It is also found in Mexico (Nuevo León).

Adults have been recorded on wing from June to August.

The larvae feed on Abies concolor and Pseudotsuga macrocarpa.

References

Moths described in 1960
lautana
Moths of North America